Hugo Henri Broos (born 10 April 1952) is a Belgian football manager and former player. He is the manager of South Africa national soccer team

Playing career
He started his football career in his hometown Humbeek, playing for KFC Humbeek and was discovered at the early age of eighteen by a scout from RSC Anderlecht. For more than ten years he was their central defender and helped them win three European trophies, three national championships and four Belgian Cups. Between 1974 and 1986 he represented Belgium, gaining 24 caps and finishing fourth at the World Cup in Mexico in 1986. In 1983 Broos switched teams and started playing for Club Brugge. He played there for five seasons until season 1987–88. During this period he helped his team gain the Belgian Cup in 1986 and the championship in 1988. In 1988 Broos retired as a professional footballer.

In his career as a football player he won the Belgian Cup five times.

Coaching career
From 1991 to 1998 Broos coached Club Brugge, winning the championship twice in 1992 and 1996. He also won the Belgian Cup in 1991, 1995 and 1996. From 2002 until 2005 he coached Anderlecht. He got the team into the Champions League and his team won the 2003–04 season championship. The following 2004–05 season was a turning point however, and the team were knocked out of the Champions League and the Belgian Cup. After a 0–0 result against Gent, Broos was fired for the first time in his career. Later that year in June, he became coach for KRC Genk and got back at his former team on 30 September by beating them 4–1. During the 2007–08 season Broos left KRC Genk.

On 15 December 2008, Broos became coach of the Greek club, Panserraikos, and for the first time in his career, coached outside his home country. Panserraikos had a great campaign in Greek Cup, eliminating Panathinaikos in quarterfinals but lost against AEK Athens in the semis. Later in season Panserraikos couldn't avoid relegation. Broos left Panserraikos and became new coach of Trabzonspor on 22 June 2009 and was released on 22 November 2009. After that he was head coach of Zulte Waregem for half a season, before becoming assistant coach of Al Jazira Club.

He was sacked in 2012 and became manager of the national team of Cameroon. He led the team to victory in the 2017 Africa Cup of Nations. He took the role of sporting director of K.V. Oostende after being laid-off as Cameroon's coach in February 2018. On 5 May 2021, he was appointed manager of the South Africa national football team.

Honours

Player 
Anderlecht
 Belgian First Division: 1971–72, 1973–74, 1980–81
 Belgian Cup: 1971–72, 1972–73, 1974–75, 1975–76
 Belgian League Cup: 1973, 1974
 European Cup Winners' Cup: 1975–76, 1977–78; runner-up 1976–77
 European Super Cup: 1976, 1978
 UEFA Cup: 1982–83
 Amsterdam Tournament: 1976
Tournoi de Paris: 1977
 Jules Pappaert Cup: 1977, 1983
 Belgian Sports Merit Award: 1978

Club Brugge
 Belgian First Division: 1987–88
 Belgian Cup: 1985–86
 Belgian Super Cup: 1986
 Bruges Matins: 1984

Belgium
 FIFA World Cup: fourth place 1986

Manager 
RWD Molenbeek
 Belgian Second Division: 1989–90

Club Brugge
 Belgian First Division:1991–92, 1995–96
 Belgian Cup: 1994–95, 1995–96
 Belgian Supercup: 1991, 1992, 1994, 1996

Anderlecht
 Belgian First Division: 2003–04

Cameroon
 Africa Cup of Nations: 2017

Individual 

 Belgian Professional Manager of the Year: 1991–92, 1995–96, 2003–04, 2006–07
 Honorary Citizen of Jabbeke and Grimbergen: 2017

References

External links
 

1952 births
Living people
1986 FIFA World Cup players
Association football central defenders
Belgian expatriate sportspeople in Turkey
Belgian expatriate sportspeople in Algeria
Belgian expatriate sportspeople in Greece
Belgian expatriate sportspeople in Cameroon
Belgian expatriate sportspeople in South Africa
Belgian football managers
Belgian footballers
Belgian Pro League players
Belgium international footballers
Club Brugge KV head coaches
Club Brugge KV players
Belgian expatriate football managers
Expatriate football managers in Algeria
Expatriate football managers in Turkey
Expatriate football managers in Greece
Expatriate football managers in Cameroon
Expatriate soccer managers in South Africa
K.R.C. Genk managers
Panserraikos F.C. managers
People from Grimbergen
R.W.D. Molenbeek managers
Royal Excel Mouscron managers
R.S.C. Anderlecht managers
R.S.C. Anderlecht players
S.V. Zulte Waregem managers
Süper Lig managers
Trabzonspor managers
K.V. Oostende managers
2017 Africa Cup of Nations managers
UEFA Cup winning players
2017 FIFA Confederations Cup managers
Footballers from Flemish Brabant